The 1991 Skate America was held at the Oakland Coliseum Arena in Oakland, California. Medals were awarded in the disciplines of men's singles, ladies' singles, pair skating, and ice dancing.

Results

Men

Ladies
Harding performed a triple axel in her short program and free skating. She became the first woman to land the triple axel in the short program in major international competition.

Pairs

Ice dancing

References

External links
 Results
 Skate Canada results

Skate America, 1991
Skate America